Jiří Vávra (born 6 March 1975) is a Czech former football player. He played for the Czech Republic in 1995. He also made 174 appearances in the top division of Czech football.

References

External links

1975 births
Living people
Czech footballers
Czech Republic under-21 international footballers
Czech Republic international footballers
Czech First League players
Dukla Prague footballers
SK Slavia Prague players
FK Jablonec players
1. FK Příbram players
FK Viktoria Žižkov players
Association football midfielders